Zarrendorf is a railway station in the village of Zarrendorf, Mecklenburg-Vorpommern, Germany. The station lies on the Stralsund-Neubrandenburg railway and the train services are operated by Deutsche Bahn and Ostseeland Verkehr.

Train services
The station is served by the following services:

regional express  Stralsund - Neustrelitz - Berlin - Wünsdorf-Waldstadt - Elsterwerda
regional service (Ostseeland Verkehr) Stralsund - Neustrelitz

References

External links
Deutsche Bahn website

Railway stations in Mecklenburg-Western Pomerania
Buildings and structures in Vorpommern-Rügen